Kleine is a German and Dutch surname meaning "small". Notable people with the surname include:

 Andrea Kleine (born 1970), American writer, choreographer, and performance artist
 Christian Kleine (born 1974), German musician and DJ
 Cindy Kleine (born ), American film director, producer and video artist
 George Kleine (1864–1931), American film producer and pioneer
 Hal Kleine (1923–1957), American baseball pitcher
 Joe Kleine (born 1962), American basketball player
 Lil' Kleine (born 1994), stage name of Jorik Scholten  (born 1994), Dutch rapper
 Megan Kleine (born 1974), American swimmer
 Piet Kleine (born 1951), Dutch speed skater
 Robert Kleine (born 1941), American Michigan State Treasurer
 Theodor Kleine (1924–2014), German sprint canoer
 Thomas Kleine (born 1977), German football defender and manager

See also
 Klein (surname)
 Kleijn, surname

German-language surnames
Dutch-language surnames